Sedigheh Vasmaghi is an Iranian lawyer, poet and reformist politician. From 1999 to 2003, she was a member of the City Council of Tehran and served as the first spokesperson of the council.
She is described as a "post-Islamist activist and intellectual".

References 

 Council Profile
 

1961 births
Living people
Islamic Iran Participation Front politicians
Iranian women poets
Iranian women lawyers
Tehran Councillors 1999–2003
Iranian emigrants to Sweden
University of Tehran alumni
Academic staff of the University of Tehran
20th-century Iranian women writers
20th-century Iranian poets
21st-century Iranian women writers
21st-century Iranian poets